François-Philippe Champagne   (born June 25, 1970) is a Canadian politician who has been Minister of Innovation, Science and Industry since 2021. Champagne was formerly the Minister of Foreign Affairs from 2019 to 2021. He was elected to represent the riding of Saint-Maurice—Champlain in the House of Commons in the 2015 election for the Liberal Party. He became Minister of Innovation, Science and Industry on January 12, 2021, after a cabinet reshuffle.

Early life
Champagne was raised in Shawinigan, Quebec, and studied law at the Université de Montréal and Case Western Reserve University School of Law.  After several years working as a senior attorney for Elsag Bailey Process Automation, he joined ABB Group in 1999, eventually rising to group vice president and senior counsel. In 2008 he joined Amec PLC as a strategic development director, and was designated a "young global leader" by the World Economic Forum. Following his return to Canada, he became involved in a variety of business and non-profit ventures.

Political career

In an interview with The Globe and Mail in 2009, Champagne expressed his desire to eventually return to Canada and enter politics, citing fellow Shawinigan resident Jean Chrétien as an inspiration. Ahead of the 2015 Canadian federal election, he was nominated as the Liberal candidate in Saint-Maurice—Champlain, a riding represented at the time by New Democratic-turned-Liberal MP Lise St-Denis, and was elected to Parliament on October 19, 2015.

After his election in 2015, Champagne was appointed as parliamentary secretary to the Minister of Finance until 2017, when he was appointed Minister of International Trade.

Minister of Foreign Affairs (2019-2021)

In November 2019, Champagne became Minister of Foreign Affairs, taking the helm of Trudeau's foreign policy.

In June 2020, it was reported that Champagne had two more mortgages with the state-owned Bank of China, raising questions of potential vulnerability to foreign influence.

Champagne welcomed Trump's peace agreement between Israel and the United Arab Emirates as a positive and historic step towards a peaceful and secure Middle East, adding Canada was gladdened by suspension of Israel's plans to annex parts of the occupied Palestinian territories in the West Bank.

Minister of Innovation, Science and Industry (2021-present)

In the 2021 Canadian cabinet reshuffle, Champagne was moved out of the Foreign Affairs portfolio, and became Minister of Innovation, Science and Industry.

Personal life

Champagne has stated he is trilingual, speaking English, French and Italian.

Electoral record

References

External links

 Official Website
 Bio & mandate from the Prime Minister
 François-Philippe Champagne in the Global Affairs Canada Official Website
 

Living people
Members of the House of Commons of Canada from Quebec
Members of the 29th Canadian Ministry
Members of the King's Privy Council for Canada
Liberal Party of Canada MPs
People from Longueuil
People from Shawinigan
Université de Montréal alumni
Case Western Reserve University alumni
Lawyers in Quebec
1970 births
Canadian Ministers of Foreign Affairs
Government ministers of Canada